The AGM-83 Bulldog was a missile produced by the United States.

The missile had its origins in the AGM-12 Bullpup. The Bullpup used a manual guidance system which required the launching aircraft to continue flying towards the target throughout the missile flight time, making it highly vulnerable to counterattack. The U.S. Navy and Air Force requested a pilot-independent guidance system for the Bullpup which would let the launching aircraft turn away after firing.

In 1970, Texas Instruments was given a Navy contract to create a laser guidance system for the Bullpup. The new missile was designated AGM-83 Bulldog; it was developed in cooperation with the Naval Weapons Center (NWC). The Bulldog was heavily based on the AGM-12B Bullpup A, but used a new 113 kg (250 lb) MK 19 blast-fragmentation warhead. It homed in on the reflection of a laser beam which was projected onto the target by ground troops.

Firing trials of the AGM-83A took place in 1971–1972, with successful results. The Navy planned to get the Bulldog into service by 1974. A version for ground handling training known as the ATM-83A was also planned. However, in 1972 it was decided that the Navy should instead procure a laser-guided version of the Air Force's AGM-65 Maverick, the AGM-65C—which itself was later cancelled in favour of the AGM-65E.

Operators
 :  The United States Navy cancelled the AGM-83 prior to service entry.

AGM-083
Abandoned military rocket and missile projects of the United States